Mustafa Anwar Parvez Babu (born 25 July 1982) is a football coach and former footballer from Bangladesh. Anwar played as a left back for the Bangladesh national team from 1999 to 2007. He won the SAFF Championship with the Bangladesh national football team as a player and also won the trophy as the coach of the Bangladesh U15 football team.

Managerial career

Bangladesh U15
After failing being knocked out of the semi-finals of the 2017 SAFF U-15 Championship, the following year Anwar guided the Bangladesh U15 team to the U15 SAFF Cup in 2018. In 2020, he was appointed as the Head of BFF Elite Academy FC  by BFF.

Honours

Club

 Dhaka Abahani 

Dhaka League: 2001
National Football Championship: 2000
Federation Cup: 1999, 2000

International

Bangladesh
SAFF Championship: 2003

Manager
Bangladesh U15
SAFF U-15 Championship: 2018

References 

1982 births
Living people
Footballers from Dhaka
Bangladeshi footballers
Bangladesh international footballers
Bangladeshi football managers
Abahani Limited (Dhaka) players
Brothers Union players
Muktijoddha Sangsad KC players
Association football fullbacks